Salata may refer to:

Places
 Šalata, a neighborhood of Zagreb, Croatia
 Salata, Poland, a village in Poland

People
 Achille Salata, Italian sculptor
 Andy Salata (1900–83) American football player
 Greg Salata (born 1949) is an American actor
 Kornel Saláta (born 1985), Slovak footballer
 Paul Salata (born 1926), American football player
 Sandra Sałata, Polish footballer

Other
 Salad in various European languages
 Salata Rule, NFL Draft rule named for Paul Salata